The 1998 Bucknell Bison football team was an American football team that represented Bucknell University during the 1998 NCAA Division I-AA football season. Bucknell tied for third in the Patriot League. 

In their fourth year under head coach Tom Gadd, the Bison compiled a 6–5 record. Erich Muzi, Jeremy Myers and Neal Thompson were the team captains.

The Bison outscored opponents 278 to 243. Their 3–3 conference record tied for third in the seven-team Patriot League standings. 

Bucknell played its home games at Christy Mathewson–Memorial Stadium on the university campus in Lewisburg, Pennsylvania.

Schedule

References

Bucknell
Bucknell Bison football seasons
Bucknell Bison football